Henryk Józef Blaszka (born 25 February 1958) is a Polish sailor. He competed in the Finn event at the 1988 Summer Olympics.

References

1958 births
Living people
Sportspeople from Poznań
Polish male sailors (sport)
Olympic sailors of Poland
Sailors at the 1988 Summer Olympics – Finn